Wigston Magna railway station was a railway station serving Wigston Magna in Leicestershire.

History
A new Wigston railway station was opened on the new main line, and the Midland Counties station was renamed  to reduce confusion.

In 1872 a south chord was added to Wigston Junction, creating a direct link between Wigston Magna and  stations.

In its heyday Wigston was an important interchange with large sidings and wagon repair shop. A motive power depot (MPD) was added in 1873.

In the 1923 grouping the Midland became part of the London, Midland and Scottish Railway and later the second Wigston station was renamed Wigston Magna for further clarity. The London, Midland and Scottish Railway closed the MPD in 1934 but reopened it in the Second World War while Leicester MPD was being rebuilt.

British Railways closed the MPD again in 1955.

Stationmaster

James Wilkinson until 1861 (afterwards station master at Foulridge)
G. Rawlings 1861 - 1862 (formerly station master at Alvechurch, afterwards station master at Desborough)
F. Hessey 1862 - 1864 
Alexander McCall 1864 - 1865 (afterwards station master at Mountsorrell Junction)
H. Jeffries from 1865 (formerly station master at Mountsorrel Junction)
John Henry Garton ca. 1871 - 1898 (afterwards station master at Kettering)
Walter George Fudge 1898 - 1922 (formerly station master at Sileby)
John James Wood Grundy from 1922 
Harry Finch
T. Bond ca. 1936 - 1940 (also stationmaster at Glen Parva and South Wigston, afterwards station master at Barking)

Route

References

Railway stations in Great Britain opened in 1857
Railway stations in Great Britain closed in 1968
Former Midland Railway stations
Disused railway stations in Leicestershire
Beeching closures in England
Railway depots in England
Charles Henry Driver railway stations
1857 establishments in England